Óscar Jaenada Gajo (born 4 May 1975) is a Spanish actor.

Career

Jaenada began acting at the age of thirteen, performing in Shakespeare plays. The memory of his grandmother taking him to the Rívoli Cinema made him want to become an actor, as he commented in the magazine Fotogramas.
He trained with the theater group l'Endoll de Esplugues de Llobregat.

Jaenada moved to Madrid to improve his career prospects, and got a job as a waiter at the Hard Rock Café. He obtained several television roles, appearing in 7 vidas and Hospital Central, before landing roles in feature films. Some of his early roles were in such productions as Lisístrata (2002) and Descongélate (2003).
Shortly afterwards, Achero Mañas offered him the leading role in November (2003). Jaenada was a candidate for the Goya Awards in 2004 as best actor for his role in this production but couldn't attend the ceremony as he was in Argentina filming El juego de la verdad.
Upon his return to Spain, he was offered several roles in comedies. Among them was the lead in the film XXL (2004). He also obtained a permanent role in the series Javier ya no vive solo.

Just as Jaenada was beginning to feel pigeonholed as a comedian, Jaime Chávarri sent him a script for a film about the life of flamenco singer Camarón de la Isla. The role involved singing, and the actor had doubts about accepting since he could not sing. He eventually took the role upon the urging of his brother Victor, a visual artist.

Camarón premiered at the San Sebastián International Film Festival in 2005, where critics already hinted at a possible Goya Award.
On 15 December 2005, Jaenada was nominated for the Goya Award for Best Actor in Camarón. Nine days later, he was nominated for the Silver Frames prize and the Circle of Cinematographic Writers medal.
At the beginning of 2006, Jaenada won all three honours. The Circle of Cinematographic Writers recognized him as best actor of the year, he won the Goya Award, and on 20 February, he received the Silver Frames prize.
Also in 2006, Jaenada served as master of ceremonies with Candela Peña at the inaugural gala of the Málaga Film Festival. A week later, he obtained a nomination at the Spanish Actors Union for his work with Chavarri.

In 2011, Jaenada auditioned for a role in Pirates of the Caribbean: On Stranger Tides, where he played a Spanish officer. He returned to the pirate theme in 2011 for the Telecinco series Piratas.

Personal life
Jaenada has a son with actress Barbara Goenaga, with whom he was romantically linked from 2000 until 2012.

In April 2017, he was sentenced to six months in prison for falsifying the official title of Recreational Boat Skipper in a nautical school. Jaenada admitted to the charges and reached an agreement to have the penalty commuted to a 3,600 Euro fine.

Selected filmography

Film

Television

Awards and recognition
 Goya Awards – Best New Actor for Noviembre (2003)
 Goya Awards – Best Actor for Camarón (2005)
 Silver Frames – Best Actor for Camarón (2005)
 Circle of Cinematographic Writers – Best Actor for Camarón (2005)
 Platino Awards – Best Actor for Cantinflas (2015)
 Ariel Award for Best Actor for Cantinflas (2015)

References

External links

 

1975 births
Living people
Spanish male film actors
Male film actors from Catalonia
Male actors from Barcelona
21st-century Spanish male actors
People from Esplugues de Llobregat
Spanish Romani people
Romani male actors